Krasnoyarsky is a rural locality (a khutor) in Kondrashovskoye Rural Settlement, Ilovlinsky District, Volgograd Oblast, Russia. The population was 322 as of 2010. There are 8 streets.

Geography 
Krasnoyarsky is located in steppe, on the bank of the Ilovlya River, on south of the Volga Upland, 15 km northeast of Ilovlya (the district's administrative centre) by road. Avilov is the nearest rural locality.

References 

Rural localities in Ilovlinsky District